The 7th Secretariat of the Communist Party of Vietnam (CPV), formally the 7th Secretariat of the Central Committee of the Communist Party of Vietnam (Vietnamese: Ban Bí thư Ban Chấp hành Trung ương Đảng Cộng sản Việt Nam Khoá VII), was elected by the 1st Plenary Session of the 7th Central Committee (CC) in the immediate aftermath of the 7th National Congress.

Members

References

Bibliography
 

7th Secretariat of the Communist Party of Vietnam